USS Slater (DE-766) is a  that served in the United States Navy and later in the Hellenic (Greek) Navy. Following service during World War II, the ship was transferred to Greece and renamed Aetos. Decommissioned in 1991, the destroyer escort was returned to the United States.

USS Slater is now a museum ship on the Hudson River in Albany, New York, the only one of its kind afloat in the United States. As of 2020, fewer than 12 destroyer escorts survive, with Slater the only one in its wartime configuration. Slater was designated a National Historic Landmark on 2 March 2012.

USS Slater was struck by the Hudson River touring ship Dutch Apple on 10 September 2019. A mechanical issue aboard Dutch Apple was to blame for the collision.

Namesake
Frank Olga Slater was born on 19 December 1920 in Kennamer Cove, Alabama, one of twelve children of James Lafayette Slater, a sharecropper and Lenora (Morgan) Slater. He grew up in Fyffe, Alabama. He enlisted in the United States Naval Reserve on 10 February 1942. Upon completion of his basic training, he was transferred to the Receiving Station at Pearl Harbor, and assigned to the heavy cruiser  on 4 April 1942. On 12 November 1942 he was killed in action at his battle station during the Naval Battle of Guadalcanal. He was posthumously awarded the Navy Cross.

Construction and career 
USS Slater was laid down on 9 March 1943, she was christened on 20 Feb 1944 by Lenora Slater, mother of Frank Olga Slater and launched on 20 February 1944. The ship was commissioned on 1 May 1944. She was built at the Tampa Shipbuilding Company in Tampa, Florida for an estimated cost of $3,399,000 (adjusted for inflation, roughly $54,777,341.00 in 2022).

After a shakedown cruise near Bermuda in June 1944, Slater assisted with the transfer of torpedoes from the captured German submarine U-505, from Bermuda to Puerto Rico and on to Maryland. She was then sent to Key West where she served as a sonar school ship. On 3 October 1944, Slater reported for convoy duty in Brooklyn, New York; she would spend the next 7 months alternating between convoy duty and additional training in Portland, Maine. By the end of the war in Europe, Slater escorted a total of five convoys to the United Kingdom, listed below:

In June 1945 Slater headed for the Pacific, stopping at the US Virgin Islands, Guantánamo Bay Naval Base and Coco Solo, Panama. She went through the Panama Canal on 28 June 1945 and stopped at San Diego before sailing to Pearl Harbor. From there she joined Task Unit 33.2.4 at Manila in September and escorted it to Yokohama. Slater engaged in support operations in the Pacific through the remainder of the year. She made another passage through the Canal on her way to Norfolk for deactivation. Slater was placed in the reserve fleet at Green Cove Springs, Florida in 1947.

Greek service

On 1 March 1951, Slater was transferred to the Hellenic Navy under the Truman Doctrine, and renamed Aetos ("Eagle") (D01). Along with three other Cannon-class ships, she made up what was known as the "Wild Beasts" Flotilla. The ship did patrol duty in the eastern Aegean and the Dodecanese and also served as a training vessel for naval cadets. Aetos was decommissioned in 1991, and Greece donated the ship to the Destroyer Escort Sailors Association.

Retirement

Destroyer escort sailors from around the nation donated more than $250,000 
($ today) to bring Slater back to the United States as a museum ship. In 1993, a Russian ocean-going tugboat towed the ship from Crete to New York City, where it was docked next to the aircraft carrier . Volunteers began restoring the ship and seeking a permanent home for her; Albany, New York, was decided upon. On 26 October 1997, Slater arrived at the Port of Albany. In January 2006, a welder accidentally started a fire aboard Slater which caused some minor damage to the ship. Repairs were completed within a few months. Restoration of the ship remains an ongoing project.

On 7 May 1998, Slater was listed on the National Register of Historic Places.

Slater was refitted several times during her long service with two navies. One of her depth-charge racks and four "K-gun" depth charge launchers have been removed. Two twin Bofors 40 mm guns have been added, and the ten single 20 mm guns have been replaced with nine twin mounts.

Appearances in film

Slater has been featured in three motion pictures. The ship was seen in The Guns of Navarone (1961) and I Aliki sto Naftiko (Η Αλίκη στο Ναυτικό/Alice in the Navy, filmed in 1961) while in Greek service.

In August 2008 part of the Japanese film Last Operations Under the Orion (2009) was filmed on board. Although the film depicts a battle between a Japanese submarine and a US Navy destroyer, Slater was used instead despite being a destroyer escort. Scenes were filmed on board, and a to-scale model of the ship was built and used for CGI shots at sea.

See also
 List of museum ships
 List of National Historic Landmarks in New York
 National Register of Historic Places listings in Albany, New York

References

External links
 
 USS Slater website
 USS Slater Photos
 Dictionary of American Naval Fighting Ships: Slater (DE-766)
 NavSource Online: Destroyer Escort Photo Archive - USS Slater (DE 766)
 Historical Naval Ships Association Ship Page: USS Slater
Destroyer Escort Sailors Association

Cannon-class destroyer escorts of the United States Navy
Ships built in Tampa, Florida
1944 ships
World War II frigates and destroyer escorts of the United States
Wild Beast-class destroyers (1951)
Naval museums in the United States
Museum ships in New York (state)
Ships on the National Register of Historic Places in New York (state)
National Historic Landmarks in New York (state)
USS Slater
Military and war museums in New York (state)
National Register of Historic Places in Albany, New York